Kvashyne is a village in Amvrosiivka (district) in Donetsk Oblast of eastern Ukraine.

Demographics
Native language as of the Ukrainian Census of 2001:
 Ukrainian 2.46%
 Russian 95.90%
 Armenian and Moldovan 0.82%

References

Villages in Donetsk Raion